Mioče is a village in Bijelo Polje Municipality, in northern Montenegro. According to the 2011 census, the village had a population of 72 people. It is situated below the Lisa mountain (1503 m). The population belongs to the historical tribes of Vasojevići, Moračani, Rovčani and others.

Geography
Hamlets include: Zebiće, Mahala, Iren, Osoje, Johovac, Zakriževac, Gornje Selo, Dobro Brdo, Ograde, Dolina, Ravni, Okrugla Njiva, Dobro Brdo, Lisa, Jedina Bukva, Brotna Poljana, Kucista, Kozarevci, Vučja Jama and Brocanci. Peaks include Radov Krš and Markov Kamen. Springs include Perišina Voda, Iren, Radovanovica and Jela. It is located 111 km from Podgorica.

Demographic history
•Year 1948 population 434;
•Year 1953 population 465;
•Year 1961 population 558;
•Year 1971 population 652;
•Year 1981 population 611;
•Year 1991 population 429;
•Year 2003 population 274;
•Year 2011 population 72.

POPULATION, HOUSEHOLDS AND DWELLINGS
source Population Census in Montenegro 2011 tables N1 to N5 
http://www.monstat.org

Population 72.
Households 31.
Dwellings 52

Population by ethnicity:
Serbs 35; 
monenegrins 34;
Others 3 ;
 :File:Mioce-Bijelo Polje Population by etnicity.pdf
Population by language:

Speak Serbian 53;
Speak montenegrin 13 ;
Others 6;
 :File:Mioce-Bijelo Polje Population by language.pdf
Population by religion:

Orthodox 60;
Others 12

References

Sources
http://www.njegos.org/census/index.htm
Bijelo Polje Municipality
http://www.monstat.org
http://www.monstat.org/cg/page.php?id=536&pageid=536
http://monstat.org/userfiles/file/popis2011/saopstenje/knjiga_prvi%20rezultati(1).pdf

External links
 Google satellite map (-{Maplandia}-)
 Mioce Lijepo Srbsko Selo https://www.facebook.com/pages/Mioce-Lijepo-Srbsko-Selo/152287894828022
 Mioce-Dobrinje pod planinom Lisom https://www.facebook.com/groups/51958118472/?fref=ts

Populated places in Bijelo Polje Municipality
Serb communities in Montenegro